The 2018–19 Latvian–Estonian Basketball League, known as OlyBet Latvian–Estonian Basketball League for sponsorship reasons, was the inaugural season of the newly formed Latvian–Estonian Basketball League, the combined top basketball division of Latvia and Estonia.

The season began on 28 September 2018, with the 2018 Estonian champions Kalev/Cramo hosting a game against the 2018 Latvian champions Ventspils. The Final Four was played at the Saku Suurhall in Tallinn, Estonia, with Ventspils winning the inaugural title.

Competition format
The competition format follows the usual double round-robin format. During the course of the regular season, which lasts from 28 September 2018 to 24 March 2018, all the teams play each other twice, once at home and once away, for a total of 28 games. Teams receive two points for a win and one point for a loss. Teams are ranked by total points, with the eight highest-ranked teams advancing to the double-legged quarter-finals. The winning teams will determine the champion in a Final Four tournament.

Teams

15 teams, 7 from Estonia and 8 from Latvia, are contesting the league in the 2018–19 season.

Venues and locations

Personnel and sponsorship

Regular season

League table

Results

Play-offs
The quarter-finals were played with a double-legged format while the semi-finals and final in a Final Four format was hosted at the Saku Suurhall in Tallinn, Estonia.

Bracket

Quarter-finals

|}

Semi-finals

|}

Third place game

|}

Final

|}

Individual statistics
Players qualify to this category by having at least 50% games played.

Points

Rebounds

Assists

Awards

Most Valuable Player
 Rihards Lomažs ( Ventspils)

Player of the Month

Estonian championship

Bracket

Quarterfinals

|}

Semifinals

|}

Third place series

|}

Finals

|}

Latvian championship
The six best Latvian teams qualified for the national play-offs, that started on 10 April 2019.

Quarterfinals and semifinals are played in a best-of-five games format (1-1-1-1-1) while the final in a best of seven one.

Bracket

Quarterfinals

|}

Semifinals

|}

Third place series
The team with the higher seed played game one, two, five and seven (if necessary) at home.

|}

Finals

|}

Estonian and Latvian clubs in European competitions

References

External links
Official website
Estonian Basketball Association 
Latvian Basketball Association 

Latvia-Estonia
Latvian–Estonian Basketball League
2018–19 in Estonian basketball
2018–19 in Latvian basketball